La Thoại Tân is a pseudonym of Phạm Văn Tần (1937–2008), buddhist name Nhật Biện, who was a Vietnamese American actor and singer.

Biography
La Thoại Tân was born in Saigon on 24 April 1937. He was late to enter the "village of the art" but it was quick for him to be famous. He was known much of versatile talent.

Career

Drama
 Fear of wife is hero
 The daughter of Mrs Hằng
 Jealousy
 New shirt

Film

 Trương Chi - Mỵ Nương (1956)
 Bóng người đi (1963)
 Silk of Love (1963)
 Gánh hàng hoa (1971)
 Tear of Stone (1971)
 Trần Thị Diễm Châu (1971)
 My Honey (1972)
 Hoa Mới Nở (1973)
 Four Oddballs of Saigon
 Five Bumpkins (1974)
 Velvet Eyes
 Phật Thích Ca đắc đạo
 Tứ Quái Sài Gòn
 Đò Chiều
 The daughter of Mrs Hằng
 Bloody cassock
 Ngưu Lang – Chức Nữ
 Ly Rượu Mừng
 Gác Chuông Nhà thờ
 Người Chồng Bất Đắc Dĩ
 Biển Động
 Tổ Đặc Công 13
 Vĩnh Biệt Tình Hè
 Family of Mrs Tư
 Family of Mrs Út
 The Lady of the Camellias (1990)
 Dưới hai màu áo

Television
 Channel 9's show 45 Minutes with Jolly Stories (45 phút chuyện vui), 1970s.
 Channel 9's show Group of comical kings (Tiếu vương hội), 1970s.

See also
 Thành Được
 Hùng Cường
 Trần Thiện Thanh
 Thẩm Thúy Hằng
 Kim Cương

References

 La Thoại Tân with dramas
 Đại minh tinh La Thoại Tân đã ra đi vĩnh viễn
 Minh tinh đa tài La Thoại Tân đã "về thăm ông bà"

External links
IMDB

1937 births
2008 deaths
People from Ho Chi Minh City
People from Los Angeles
Vietnamese emigrants to the United States
Vietnamese male child actors
Vietnamese male film actors
20th-century Vietnamese male singers
Vietnamese male television actors
American male television actors
20th-century American male actors
20th-century American male singers
20th-century American singers